Conacher may refer to:

People
Conacher is a surname of Scottish origin. Notable people with the surname include:
 The three Conacher brothers:
 Lionel Conacher (1900–1954), Canadian multi-sport athlete and politician
 Brian Conacher (born 1941), Canadian ice hockey player, Lionel's son 
 Lionel Conacher Jr. (born 1936), Canadian football player, Lionel's son
 Charlie Conacher (1909–1967), Canadian ice hockey player
 Pete Conacher (born 1932), Canadian ice hockey player, Charlie's son
 Roy Conacher (1916–1984), Canadian ice hockey player
 Cory Conacher (born 1989), Canadian ice hockey player
 Jim Conacher (1921–2020), British-born Canadian ice hockey player
 Pat Conacher (born 1959), Canadian ice hockey player

Companies
 Conacher and Co, British organ builders based in Huddersfield, West Yorkshire

Other uses
 Conacher Cup, Canadian Australian rules football trophy named after Lionel Conacher
 Charlie Conacher Humanitarian Award, Canadian National Hockey League award